Frederick Fiske Warren (2 July 1862 – 2 February 1938) was a successful paper manufacturer, fine arts doyen, United States tennis champion of 1893, and major supporter of Henry George's single tax system which he helped develop in Harvard, Massachusetts, United States, in the 1930s.  Fiske Warren established Georgist single-tax colonies and a social experiment in Andorra to disprove Malthus's population theory.

Early life

He was the son of Samuel Dennis Warren and Susan Cornelia Warren of Beacon Hill, Boston. Born in Waltham, Massachusetts, Fiske was raised in a mansion on 67 Mount Vernon Street in Beacon Hill in Boston. He had four siblings: Samuel Dennis Warren II (1852–1910), U.S. Attorney; Henry Clarke Warren (1854–1899), scholar of Sanskrit and Pali; Edward Perry Warren (1860–1928), collector of Warren cup and Cornelia Lyman Warren who was a philanthropist. As part of a philanthropic and well educated family, the Warren brothers and sister all enjoyed tranquil childhoods growing up between the family homes in Boston and Waltham, also known as "Cedar Hill".

Married life
On 14 May 1891, he married Gretchen Osgood Warren in Boston. The Osgoods were a well-known Beacon Hill family that claimed a direct genealogical line to Anne Hutchinson and John Quincy Adams. Their country house in Harvard, Massachusetts, was added to the National Register of Historic Places in 1996.

Notes

References
The Mount Vernon Street Warrens, Martin Green, Simon & Schuster, 1989 
Erskine Childers, Jim Ring, John Murray Publishing, 1996 
Warren-Osgood Wedding Announcement from the New York TimesNewspaper

1862 births
Georgists
American philanthropists
Businesspeople from Boston
Irish-American history
American art collectors
1938 deaths
People from Harvard, Massachusetts
American male tennis players
People from Beacon Hill, Boston